Rudolf Seres (born 12 August 1945) is a Hungarian sports shooter. He competed in the mixed 50 metre free pistol event at the 1980 Summer Olympics.

References

1945 births
Living people
Hungarian male sport shooters
Olympic shooters of Hungary
Shooters at the 1980 Summer Olympics
People from Pest, Hungary